Budzinski or Budziński (feminine: Budzińska; plural: Budzińscy) is a Polish surname. It may refer to:

 Henryk Budziński (1904–1983), Polish rower
 Justyna Budzińska-Tylicka (1867–1936), Polish physician and feminist
 Lothar Budzinski-Kreth (1886–1955), German footballer
 Marcin Budziński (born 1990), Polish footballer
 Mark Budzinski (born 1973), American baseball coach and player

See also
 
 Budzynski

Polish-language surnames